Don't Wait For It is the debut studio album by American hip hop recording artist Rob Stone, released on October 20, 2017, under  Grove Town Records LLC. The album features guest appearances from Gucci Mane, Meechy Darko, Malik Burgers and more. The album's production was handled by Zaytoven, Cashmoney AP, Ricci Riera and more.

Track listing

References

2017 debut albums
Albums produced by Zaytoven